The Canton of Chénérailles is a former canton situated in the Creuse département and in the Limousin region of central France. It was disbanded following the French canton reorganisation which came into effect in March 2015. It had 4,046 inhabitants (2012).

Geography 
A farming area, with the town of Chénérailles, in the arrondissement of Aubusson, at its centre.

The canton comprised 11 communes:

Le Chauchet
Chénérailles
Issoudun-Létrieix
Lavaveix-les-Mines
Peyrat-la-Nonière
Puy-Malsignat
La Serre-Bussière-Vieille
Saint-Chabrais
Saint-Dizier-la-Tour
Saint-Médard-la-Rochette
Saint-Pardoux-les-Cards

Population

See also 
 Arrondissements of the Creuse department
 Cantons of the Creuse department
 Communes of the Creuse department

References

Chenerailles
2015 disestablishments in France
States and territories disestablished in 2015